Zuzana Liová (born 7 October 1977) is a Slovak film director and screenwriter. Her first television film, Ticho, was broadcast on Slovenská televízia in December 2005. Her directorial debut was the 2011 film The House, which she also wrote. The House won six awards at the 2012 Sun in a Net Awards including Best Film, and Liová herself for Best Screenplay.

Selected filmography

Director
Ticho (TV film, 2005)
The House (2011)
Slovensko 2.0 (2014)

References

External links

1977 births
Living people
Slovak women film directors
People from Žilina
Sun in a Net Awards winners
Slovak screenwriters